Gary McHale is a right-wing Canadian political activist, noted for involvement in the Grand River land dispute.

Personal life

In January 2013, McHale was the recipient of the Queen's Diamond Jubilee medal for contributions to his community. Nominated by the Canadian Taxpayer's Federation, McHale's award sparked controversy, with prominent First Nations leaders returning their medals as a result of his nomination.

During the Enbridge Line 9 protests and occupation in Hamilton, McHale claims to have incited the arrests of 18 anti-pipeline activists by sending a letter threatening legal action against the Hamilton Police Service.     Hamilton Police denied McHale's claims, noting that action had been planned before McHale's involvement.

Role in the Caledonia land dispute
During the Grand River land dispute, McHale organized protests against the occupation of the Douglas Creek Estates. Actions included the attempted removal of Aboriginal flags with the aim of replacing them with Canadian flags, for which he was arrested to prevent a breach of the peace. McHale's protests have been described as 'antics' in the national media.

On November 8, 2007, the OPP Police Commissioner reported to Hamilton Spectator that McHale's rallies have cost police over $500,000. According to the newspaper, 22 OPP police officers filed a $7.2 million lawsuit against McHale for defaming them on his website. McHale criticized the OPP officers who stopped him from hanging Canadian flags near the occupied site saying they were violating their oath of office. The photos of all the 22 police officers were also posted on the site under the heading "OPP: Hang your heads in shame," saying each one of them had violated their oath of office, the statement of claim said.

McHale was arrested and charged with conspiracy to commit mischief during a native smoke shop protest that turned violent in December 2007. As part of his bail conditions, McHale was barred from Caledonia and banned from communicating with certain individuals. Haldimand County mayor Marie Trainer and Haldimand—Norfolk—Brant MPP Toby Barrett spoke out in his defence.

McHale started a campaign of privately laying criminal charges against First Nations people for extortion, mischief and intimidation, which were all stayed by the Crown Prosecution Service. A judicial review case against the OPP for their refusal to appear in court when summoned by a subpoena.

Political career
In the 2008 Federal election, McHale ran as an independent in Haldimand--Norfolk riding, coming in fourth place with 10% of the vote.

In the 2010 Ontario municipal elections, McHale ran for Haldimand County Regional Council in Ward 3, losing to incumbent councillor Craig Grice.

Election results

|-
!rowspan="2" colspan="2" |Candidate
!colspan="3" |Popular vote
|- style="background-color:#fcfcfc;"
! Votes
! %
! ±%
|-
| style="background-color:#FFFFFF;" |
| style="text-align:left;" | Craig Grice (incumbent)
| style="text-align:right;" | 1,578
| style="text-align:right;" | 41.43%
| style="text-align:right;" | n/a
|-
| style="background-color:#FFFFFF;" |
| style="text-align:left;" | Gary McHale
| style="text-align:right;" |1,097
| style="text-align:right;" |28.8%
| style="text-align:right;" | n/a
|-
| style="background-color:#FFFFFF;" |
| style="text-align:left;" | Bryan Barker
| style="text-align:right;" |933
| style="text-align:right;" |24.5
| style="text-align:right;" | n/a
|-
| style="background-color:#FFFFFF;" |
| style="text-align:left;" | Rob Duncan
| style="text-align:right;" |177
| style="text-align:right;" |5.27%
| style="text-align:right;" | n/a
|-
| style="text-align:right;background-color:#FFFFFF;" colspan="2" |Total Votes
| style="text-align:right;background-color:#FFFFFF;" |3,809
| style="text-align:right;background-color:#FFFFFF;" |100%
| style="text-align:right;background-color:#FFFFFF;" |
|- 
| style="text-align:right;background-color:#FFFFFF;" colspan="2" |Registered Voters
| style="text-align:right;background-color:#FFFFFF;" |8,090
| style="text-align:right;background-color:#FFFFFF;" |47.08%
| style="text-align:right;background-color:#FFFFFF;" |n/a
|- 
| style="text-align:left;" colspan="6" |Note: All Haldimand County Municipal Elections are officially non-partisan.  Note: Candidate campaign colours are based on the prominent colour used in campaign items (signs, literature, etc.)and are used as a visual differentiation between candidates.
|- 
| style="text-align:left;" colspan="13" |Sources: Haldimand County Clerk's Office
|}

References

External links 
 Caledonia Wakeup Call, McHale's website
 McHale's Advocacy group, CANACE

Living people
Canadian activists
Year of birth missing (living people)